The Kennel Murder Case is a 1933 American pre-Code mystery film adapted from the 1933  novel of the same name by S. S. Van Dine. Directed by Michael Curtiz for Warner Bros., it stars William Powell and Mary Astor. Powell's role as Philo Vance is not the actor's first performance as the aristocratic sleuth; he also portrays the character in three films produced by Paramount in 1929 and 1930.

In the film, dog show competitor Archer Coe is found murdered within his own bedroom. There is a long list of suspects, since the victim had antagonized members of his own family, his own lover, and his own employees. The corpse of the victim's brother is soon found, hidden in a closet. One of the other suspects survives a knife attack, and the dog of Coe's neighbor is found to be seriously injured. Vance has to deduce the motives behind the attacks in order to figure out who killed Coe.

Plot
When Philo Vance's dog does not make it into the final of the Long Island Kennel Club's dog show, fellow competitor Archer Coe (Robert Barrat) is disappointed, having hoped to savor a victory over Vance. The next morning Coe is found dead, locked inside his bedroom. District Attorney Markham (Robert McWade) and Police Sergeant Heath (Eugene Pallette) assume it was suicide, because Coe was shot through the head and was found holding a pistol. Vance is not convinced. He soon finds evidence that Coe was murdered. Coroner Dr. Doremus (Etienne Girardot) determines the victim had bled to death internally from a stab wound.

There is no shortage of suspects; Coe was very much disliked. His niece Hilda Lake (Mary Astor) resented her uncle's tight control of her finances and jealousy of any men who showed interest in her. Her boyfriend, Sir Thomas MacDonald (Paul Cavanagh), suspected Coe of killing his dog to ensure winning the competition. Raymond Wrede (Ralph Morgan), the dead man's secretary, was in love with Miss Lake, but had been laughed at when he sought Coe's support. Coe's next-door neighbor and lover Doris Delafield (Helen Vinson) had been cheating on him with Eduardo Grassi (Jack La Rue). When Coe found out, he cancelled a contract to sell his collection of Chinese artworks to the Milan museum for which Grassi worked. Liang (James Lee), the cook, had worked long, hard, and illegally to help Coe amass his collection. He warned his employer against the proposed sale and was fired as a result. Even Coe's own brother Brisbane (Frank Conroy) despised Coe. Finally, Gamble (Arthur Hohl), the head servant, had concealed his criminal past.

Brisbane Coe becomes Vance's prime suspect. His alibi of taking a train at the time of the murder is disproved. When Brisbane is found dead in a closet, Vance is both puzzled and enlightened. Among Brisbane's effects, Vance finds a book titled Unsolved Murders; a bookmarked page details a method of using string to lock a door through the keyhole without leaving a trace. Part of the mystery is solved.

Later, an attempt is made on the life of Sir Thomas using the same dagger used to kill Coe. Finally, a Doberman Pinscher belonging to Miss Delafield is found seriously injured, apparently struck with a fireside poker. From these and other clues, Vance finally solves the crime.

It turns out that two men sought to end Coe's life that night. The successful murderer struggled with Coe and stabbed him, leaving him for dead. Coe awakened soon after. Too dazed to recall the fight or realize that he was mortally wounded, he went upstairs to his bedroom and opened his window before dying. Brisbane entered the chamber; seeing his brother apparently asleep in his chair, he shot the corpse and arranged the scene to look like a suicide. Downstairs, he ran into the actual killer, who had seen through a window that Archer Coe was still alive and come back to finish the job. In the darkness, the killer mistook Brisbane for Archer and killed the wrong man. Delafield's dog then wandered in, attracted by the commotion, and attacked the murderer.

While sure of the killer's identity, Vance has no proof. He therefore arranges for Sir Thomas and Wrede to quarrel over Hilda Lake. When Wrede instinctively reaches for the poker to strike his rival, the Doberman recognizes its attacker and leaps on him. Wrede confesses he became enraged when Coe refused to assist his courtship of Miss Lake, precipitating the stabbing.

Cast 

 William Powell as Philo Vance
 Mary Astor as Hilda Lake
 Eugene Pallette as Detective Heath
 Ralph Morgan as Raymond Wrede, the Secretary
 Robert McWade as District Attorney Markham
 Robert Barrat as Archer Coe
 Frank Conroy as Brisbane Coe
 Etienne Girardot as Dr. Doremus
 Paul Cavanagh as Sir Thomas MacDonald
 James Lee as Liang

 Arthur Hohl as Gamble, the butler
 Helen Vinson as Doris Delafield
 Jack La Rue as Eduardo Grassi

Uncredited:
 Harry Allen as Sandy
 Wade Boteler as Sergeant Mellish
 George Chandler as first reporter at police station
 Spencer Charters as Sgt. Snitkin
 Leo White as desk clerk (uncredited)

Cast notes:
The records of Warner Bros. indicate that original casting included Hugh Herbert as Dr. Doremus, George Blackwood as Bruce MacDonald and Claire Dodd as Doris Delafield.  Ralph Bellamy was reported to have been signed to perform in the film, but he does not appear in the film as released.

Production
The Kennel Murder Case was the first adaptation of one of S. S. Van Dine's Philo Vance novel to be filmed by Warner Bros.  Early Vance films had been made by Paramount Pictures, and later ones would be made by Warners, Paramount and MGM. Vance would be played by Warren William, Paul Lukas, Edmund Lowe, and James Stephenson.

Director Michael Curtiz covered the talkiness of the film, endemic to whodunnits of this sort, by using a mobile camera in some scenes, and kept up the pace of the film with dissolves and wipes.

Reception 
Film historian William K. Everson, who pronounced the film a "masterpiece" in the August 1984 issue of Films in Review, considers The Kennel Murder Case to be one of the greatest screen adaptations of a Golden Age mystery novel; Everson ranks it with the 1946 film Green for Danger.

The film made a profit of almost $400,000. According to Warner Bros records the film earned $441,000 domestically and $241,000 internationally.

Remake
Warners remade The Kennel Murder Case in 1940 as Calling Philo Vance, with James Stephenson playing Vance.

References

External links

 
 
 
 
 
 

1933 films
1933 mystery films
American mystery films
1930s English-language films
American black-and-white films
Films directed by Michael Curtiz
Warner Bros. films
1930s American films
Philo Vance films
Films scored by Bernhard Kaun
Films about murder
Films about dogs